Ethmophyllum is an extinct genus of sea sponge known from the Cambrian period .

References

Prehistoric sponge genera
Cambrian sponges
Paleozoic life of British Columbia
Paleozoic life of Yukon